The Kawasaki KMX is a water-cooled 2-stroke 
motorcross bike. There are two versions, the KMX 125 cc and the larger 200 cc model under the KMX title.

They both feature front and rear disc brakes, water-cooled engines, mono link suspension (Kawasaki's Uni-Trak system) and a power valve system (KIPS).

KMX 125
1986-2004

Models: A1-A13/B1-B12

The A and B model denotes whether or not the bike has been restricted down to a power output deemed necessary for a learner with a provisional drivers license in some countries or an A1 motorcycle license in the United Kingdom, The "A" models, running from 1986 to 2001 came from the factory in a unrestricted form, producing 20 bhp at the rear wheel easily reaching 85 mph with some modifications to the gearing ratio (sprockets).

References

KMX
Motorcycles introduced in 1986
Off-road motorcycles